Arnold Goldberg (May 21, 1929 – September 24, 2020) was an American psychiatrist and psychoanalyst.

Goldberg was the  Cynthia Oudejans Harris Professor of Psychiatry at the Rush Medical School, Chicago, and a supervising and training analyst at the Chicago Institute for Psychoanalysis, where he did his psychoanalytic training.

The author of Moral Stealth: How "Correct Behavior" Insinuates Itself into Psychotherapeutic Practice (2007), Misunderstanding Freud (2004), Being of Two Minds: The Vertical Split in Psychoanalysis and Psychotherapy (1999), The Problem of Perversion: The View from Self Psychology (1995), A Fresh Look at Psychoanalysis: The View From Self Psychology (1992), The Prisonhouse of Psychoanalysis (1990); (with John Gedo) Models of the Mind: A Psychoanalytic Theory (1976), he was also the editor of the annual series, Progress in Self-Psychology, now in its 24th year.

Many of Goldberg's publications  were in the realm of self psychology, expanding and clarifying the ideas of Heinz Kohut.

See also
 Heinz Kohut
 Self psychology

References

External links
University of Chicago Press: Moral Stealth – How "Correct Behavior" Insinuates Itself into Psychotherapeutic Practice
University of Chicago Press: Models of the Mind – A psychoanalytic theory

American psychoanalysts
Jewish psychoanalysts
American Jews
People from Chicago
2020 deaths
1929 births
21st-century American psychologists